Generalbezirk Litauen was one of the four administrative subdivisions of Reichskommissariat Ostland, the 1941-1945 civilian occupation regime established by Nazi Germany for the administration of the three Baltic countries (Estonia, Latvia and Lithuania) and the western part of the Byelorussian SSR.

Organization and structure 
Generalbezirk Litauen was originally organized on 25 July 1941 on the territory of the then German-occupied Lithuania, which had until then been under the military administration of the Wehrmacht's Army Group North. By 1 August 1941, in the wake of further German gains, Litauen expanded to its full extent, when the areas around Vilnius were added. The capital of Generalbezirk Litauen was Kauen.

Administrative divisions 
Generalbezirk Litauen had the following six subdivisions called Kreisgebiete (County Areas). The seat of administration is in parentheses.
Kauen-Land (Kaunas-Rural)
Kauen-Stadt (Kaunas-Urban)
Ponewesch (Panevėžys)
Schaulen (Šiauliai)
Wilna-Land (Vilnius-Rural)
Wilna-Stadt (Vilnius-Urban)

Civil and police leadership 
Civil administration was led by a Generalkommissar (General Commissioner) directly appointed by Adolf Hitler, and who reported to Ostland Reichskommissar Hinrich Lohse, headquartered in Riga. In addition, police and security matters were overseen by an SS and Police Leader (SSPF) directly appointed by Reichsführer-SS Heinrich Himmler, and who reported to the Higher SS and Police Leader (HSSPF) Ostland und Russland-Nord in Riga, SS-Gruppenführer Hans-Adolf Prützmann until 1 November 1941, and SS-Obergruppenführer Friedrich Jeckeln after that date.

Generalkommissar: Dr. Adrian von Renteln (25 July 1941 – August 1944).
SS and Police Leader: SS-Brigadeführer Lucian Wysocki (11 August 1941 – 2 July 1943); SS-Brigadeführer Hermann Harm (2 July 1943 – 8 April 1944); SS-Brigadeführer Kurt Hintze (8 April – 15 September 1944).

Holocaust 

Following the German invasion in June 1941, the death squads of Einsatzgruppe A and their Lithuanian collaborators, including the Lithuanian Security Police, immediately began the systematic murder of Lithuanian Jews. Out of approximately 208,000 – 210,000 Jews, an estimated 190,000 – 195,000 were murdered before the end of the Second World War, most between June and December 1941. More than 95% of Lithuania's Jewish population was massacred over the three-year German occupation, representing a more complete destruction than befell any other country affected by the Holocaust.

Dissolution 
On 28 July 1944, the Red Army launched the Kaunas offensive. On 1 August 1944, Kauen fell and Generalbezirk Litauen effectively ceased to exist. Administration of those parts of Lithuania still under German occupation reverted to military administration under Army Group North. Generalkommissar von Renteln was reportedly  captured at the end of the war and executed in the Soviet Union in 1946, but this is unconfirmed. According to another account, he managed to successfully escape to South America.

See also 
 German occupation of Lithuania during World War II
 The Holocaust in Lithuania

References

Generalbezirk Litauen
States and territories disestablished in 1944
States and territories established in 1941
World War II occupied territories